Meriwether Smith (1730 – January 25, 1790) was an American planter from Essex County, Virginia.

Smith was first elected to the Virginia House of Burgesses in 1770. He was a vocal opponent of the 1765 Stamp Act, and a representative in the revolutionary conventions that replaced the burgesses in 1775 and 1776. He was elected as a delegate to the Continental Congress in 1778, 1779, and 1780, although he did not serve the 1779 term. He was a member of the Virginia House of Delegates from 1776 to 1778 and again in 1781. In 1788 he was a member of the Virginia convention that ratified the U.S. Constitution; an Anti-Federalist, he voted against ratification.

Smith was married twice, first to Alice Lee in 1760 and after her death to Elizabeth Daingerfield in 1769. His son by Alice was George William Smith who was Governor of Virginia from part of 1811. Meriwether died in Essex County in January 1790
, and was buried in a family plot on his plantation, "Bathurst."

External links

1730 births
1790 deaths
Continental Congressmen from Virginia
18th-century American politicians
House of Burgesses members
Members of the Virginia House of Delegates
Delegates to the Virginia Ratifying Convention
People from Essex County, Virginia